This article lists all rugby league footballers who have played first-grade for the Gold Coast Titans in the National Rugby League.

NOTES:
 Debut:
 Players are listed in the order of their debut game with the club.
 Players that debuted in the same game are added in the order of their jersey number. 
 Appearances: Gold Coast Titans games only, not a total of their career games. E.g. Preston Campbell has played a career total of 267 first-grade games but of those, 103 were at the Gold Coast.
 Previous Club: refers to the previous first-grade rugby league club (NRL or Super League) the player played at and does not refer to any junior club, Rugby Union club or a rugby league club he was signed to but never played at.
 The statistics in this table are correct as of round 2 of the 2023 NRL season.

List of players

References

Rugby League Tables / Gold Coast Titans Point Scorers
RLP List of Players
RLP Gold Coast Titans Transfers & Debuts

 
Players
Lists of Australian rugby league players
National Rugby League lists
Gold Coast, Queensland-related lists